The Eshqua Bog Natural Area is a protected area in Hartland, Vermont. It is 41 acres containing a wet bog. It is near Woodstock, about 11 miles west of White River Junction. There is a boardwalk allowing access to the wetland and views of rare plants.

The flora of the area includes many post-glacial cold-climate plants native to bog and fen habitat, including Labrador tea, cotton grass, pitcher plants, showy lady's slippers, larches, and buckbean.

The hard work of then Director of Science & Stewardship Mark P. DesMeules was most influential in seeing this natural area protected.  Mark negotiated the purchase through, at the time, a unique joint fundraising campaign between the New England Wild Flower Society and The Nature Conservancy, which continue to jointly manage the property.  This successful campaign allowed for the purchase of the area now protected.  Mark also designed and installed the trail system with a host of wonderful volunteers and he designed and built the first boardwalk allowing visitors to enjoy the beautiful lady's slippers.

References

External links
 Esqua Bog Natural Area - New England Wild Flower Society

Nature reserves in Vermont
Wetlands of Vermont
Hartland, Vermont
Bogs of the United States
Landforms of Windsor County, Vermont
Protected areas of Windsor County, Vermont